Vezzoli is a surname. Notable people with the surname include: 

Francesco Vezzoli (born 1971), Italian artist and filmmaker
Roberto Vezzoli, Italian sport shooter

See also
Vezzosi

Italian-language surnames